Mitt Romney has unsuccessfully run for president twice:

 Mitt Romney 2008 presidential campaign
 Mitt Romney 2012 presidential campaign